Akihiro Maeda (前田 章宏, born June 19, 1983) is a Japanese former professional baseball catcher for the Chunichi Dragons in Japan's Nippon Professional Baseball. He played from 2003 to 2013.

External links

NBP.com

1983 births
Living people
Baseball people from Nagoya
Japanese expatriate baseball players in the Dominican Republic
Nippon Professional Baseball catchers
Chunichi Dragons players
Japanese baseball coaches
Nippon Professional Baseball coaches
Estrellas Orientales players